Jamalul ibni Punjungan Kiram III (16 July 1938 – 20 October 2013) was a former self-proclaimed Sultan of the Sulu Sultanate who claimed to be "the poorest sultan in the world". He was known as an unsuccessful candidate for senator in the Philippine general elections in 2007. In 2013, Kiram III sparked a controversy when he revived a dispute between the Philippines and Malaysia by leading an intrusion into the eastern part of Sabah. His daughter is Princess Jacel Kiram, a proponent of the Sabah claim of the Philippines in 2016.

Early life
Jamalul was born in Mainbung, Sulu. He was the eldest son of Datu Punjungan Kiram and Sharifa Usna Dalus Strattan. He is descended from the first Sultan of Sulu, Sharif ul-Hāshim of Sulu from the Banu Hashem tribe, the direct descendants of Muhammad. Kiram III also claimed to have a common ancestor with Brunei's current sultan Hassanal Bolkiah, although this was denied by Brunei.

Kiram III studied in Jolo Central Elementary School from 1946 to 1951. He finished high school at the Sulu High School in 1955 and took up pre-law from 1956 to 1958 at Notre Dame of Jolo. He studied for a Bachelor of Law degree from Manuel L. Quezon University (MLQU) in 1964 but was unable to finish it and pursued a career in dance instead. He was married to Dayang Hadja Fatima Celia H. Kiram, and resided in Taguig, Metro Manila. He had two daughters, including Jacel Kiram.

As pretender

He claimed to be responsible for the release of the American and the German nationals from the captivity of the lost command of the Moro National Liberation Front (MNLF) in 1984. He established livelihood programs in Sulu, Tawi-Tawi and Palawan through the Sulu-Marine and Seven Seas Corporations. During the Zamboanga City crisis, he criticised his previous ally, Nur Misuari, for waging a war against the Philippine government. He also served as the president of the Philippine Pencak Silat Association and once served as a board member in the Philippine Olympic Committee. In the 2007 elections, he unsuccessfully ran as Senator under the banner of TEAM Unity. He had previously Legislative and Executive Advisory Council on the Sabah Claim Presidential Adviser on Muslim Royalties' Concern under Gloria Macapagal Arroyo. With his retirement, the succession rights of the sultanate was disputed among his heirs such as Mohammad Akijal Atti. The dispute on the succession rights ended on 11 November 2012 when claimants from the Kiram family (descendants of Punjungan Kiram only) met together in Sulu, ending their decade-long feud. After the family meeting, Kiram III once again became the self-proclaimed Sultan alongside Ismael Kiram II. He also declared Rajah Mudah Agbimuddin Kiram as "crown prince". He was a member of the Ruma Betchara (Council of the Sultan) during the reign of his late uncle, Esmail Kiram. He acted in place of his father during the absence of his father Punjungan Kiram while in Sabah and later proclaimed himself in 1984 as 33rd Sultan of Sulu and was crowned on 15 June 1986 in Jolo, Sulu. Kiram III forged the century-old relationships between Sulu and China during a so-called royal visit to Dezhou, where the descendants of Sulu King Paduka Pahala live, in the Shandong Province of the People's Republic of China in September 1999 with an 87-man entourage. The visit concluded with the signing of the agreement between Hebei Province and the Sulu Sultanate on agricultural technology exchange. He also forged bilateral relationships between the Don Sasagawa Foundation of Japan and the Sultan Jamalul Ahlam Foundation. Jamalul Alam was the recipient of various hospital equipment from Japan which were in turn donated to the Sulu Provincial Hospital in 1992.

Beginning on 9 February 2013, approximately 200 men led by his brother, Agbimuddin Kiram intruded into neighbouring Sabah in Malaysia by entering illegally into Lahad Datu, in an effort to assert the former Sulu Sultanate's claim to the state. Kiram was reported to have directed them to intrude and not leave, claiming that "Malaysia is only renting Sabah" from the heirs of the Sultanate. The men, many of whom were heavily armed, engaged in a standoff with Malaysian police and armed forces which saw the death of 56 of his followers while the rest were either captured or escaped. The intrusion into neighbouring territory was believed to have been caused when the Philippine government treated him and his wife only as "decorations" during the signing of a framework agreement with the Moro Islamic Liberation Front (MILF). President Benigno Aquino III blamed Kiram and his followers for dragging the Philippines into the dispute, with a bad impact on overseas Filipinos in Malaysia and hurting relations between the two. His act drew criticism from most Filipinos in Sabah as many of them have become a victim of discrimination and retaliation from the local Borneo tribes due to the killing of Malaysian police who mainly comprising the indigenous Borneo races, as well from other claimants who decried his actions and want to retake the eastern part of Sabah through peaceful means without any bloodshed.

Death
On 20 October 2013, Kiram III died at the age of 75 due to multiple organ failure. He made a dying request to be buried at the capital of the Sultanate in Maimbung, Sulu. He left eight children by two wives. Numerous political personalities paid their respects to the late Sultan including Autonomous Region in Muslim Mindanao Governor Mujiv Hataman and Sulu Vice-governor Abdusakur Mahail Tan, Former First Lady of the Philippines Imelda Marcos, and the Malacañang Palace.

His spokesman said that their "royal family" would continue to pursue their main intention over the former dispute between Philippines and Malaysia. The Malaysian branch of police in Sabah has stated that they "would continue to be alert for any intrusion".

Family
Kiram III's daughter, Princess Jacel Kiram, is the designated spokeswoman of the late sultan and the most known of all the members of the Sulu royal family. The princess is currently living in a subdivision established by the Philippine government in Taguig in 1974, along with other members of Kiram III's family. Her father's royal bloodline established her royal ties with the Muslim royals of Sulu, Basilan, Tawi-tawi, Maguindanao, and Lanao del Sur. Her grandmother from the maternal side came from Pangasinan in the Ilocos Region, while her grandfather came from Sorsogon in the Bicol Region. Her name is literally an amalgamation of the Muslim name, Jamulul (from her father), and the Christian name, Celia (from her mother). In 2002, she finished her bachelor of arts with a degree in Inter-Disciplinary Studies at De La Salle–College of Saint Benilde. During that time, her thesis, “The Sulu Sultanate’s Genealogy and its Relation to the Philippines’ Claim to Sabah” was declared as Best Thesis. In 2013, she married Moh Yusop Hasan, a Filipino army major. In 2017, she headed the Philippine delegation on the 19th World Festival of Youth and Students in the World Federation of Democratic Youth held in Sochi, Russia. She was also a delegate of the Philippines to China in celebration of the 600th Year of Sulu-China Friendship, coinciding with the book launching of Friendship Without Borders, in Guangxi. Jacel also participated in a United Nations-sponsored conference on Drug Control Program held at the United Nations Office in Vienna, Austria. She was also the chairman of People's Coalition for Peace.

References 

Filipino male dancers
Claimants of the Sultanate of Sulu throne
Filipino datus, rajas and sultans
Filipino Muslims
Filipino people of Arab descent
Manuel L. Quezon University alumni
People from Taguig
People from Sulu
1938 births
2013 deaths
Deaths from multiple organ failure
Terrorism in Malaysia
Tausūg people